Mount Nickens is a snow-covered mesa-type mountain with a steep northern rock face, marking the northwest extremity of the Hudson Mountains. It stands just east of the base of Canisteo Peninsula and overlooks Cosgrove Ice Shelf. It was mapped from air photos taken by U.S. Navy Operation Highjump in 1946–47. It was named by the Advisory Committee on Antarctic Names (US-ACAN) for Herbert P. Nickens, a map compilation specialist who contributed significantly to the construction of United States Geological Survey (USGS) sketch maps of Antarctica.

See also
 Mountains in Antarctica

References

Hudson Mountains
Mountains of Ellsworth Land
Volcanoes of Ellsworth Land